Google Cloud Search (formerly known as Google Springboard) is an AI-powered assistant which aid users to quickly find relevant information, as and when they need it across all associated Google apps, including (but not restricted to) Gmail, Google Docs, Google Drive, Google Calendar, Google Contacts and others alike. It also provides “actionable information & recommendations” to users based on statistical probability gathered using Machine Learning.

Springboard also integrates with Google Sites – a tool for creating web pages. The updated app now supports collaboration between users and lets them add content from services like Google Docs, Calendar and Google Maps. Some of its applications could be to quickly build things like guides and how-to(s).

In February 2017, Google Springboard was renamed Google Cloud Search.

Release 
At the time of launch (June 13, 2016), Google had its Springboard broadly at an "Invite-only" access and at the moment, it has closed the applications towards its Early Adopter Program.

References

External links 
 
Richard Shell: "Springboard: Launching Your Personal Search for Success" | Talks at Google

Springboard
Applications of artificial intelligence